was a  after Tennin and before Eikyū. This period spanned the years from July 1110 through July 1113.

Change of Era
 January 22, 1110 : The new era name was created to mark an event or series of events.  The previous era ended and the new one commenced in Tennin 4, on the 16th day of the 7th month of 1110.

Events of the Ten'ei Era
 1109 (Ten'ei 1, in the 5th month): Emperor Toba visited Hosho-ji where he donated a Buddhist manuscript which had been created using gold characters on blue paper.
 1110 (Ten'ei 1, in the 6th month): The Miidera-ji burned down.  This was the second time the temple was destroyed by fire, the first time being in 1081.

Notes

References
 Brown, Delmer M. and Ichirō Ishida, eds. (1979).  Gukanshō: The Future and the Past. Berkeley: University of California Press. ;  OCLC 251325323
 Nussbaum, Louis-Frédéric and Käthe Roth. (2005).  Japan encyclopedia. Cambridge: Harvard University Press. ;  OCLC 58053128
 Titsingh, Isaac. (1834). Nihon Odai Ichiran; ou,  Annales des empereurs du Japon.  Paris: Royal Asiatic Society, Oriental Translation Fund of Great Britain and Ireland. OCLC 5850691
 Varley, H. Paul. (1980). A Chronicle of Gods and Sovereigns: Jinnō Shōtōki of Kitabatake Chikafusa. New York: Columbia University Press.  ;  OCLC 6042764

External links
 National Diet Library, "The Japanese Calendar" -- historical overview plus illustrative images from library's collection

Japanese eras
1110s in Japan